Moonheart is an urban fantasy novel by Canadian writer Charles de Lint. It takes place in 1980s Ottawa, where Sara Kendell and Jamie Tamson, owners of an antique store, come into possession of a peculiar ring. At the same time Kieran Foy, a wizard of sorts, is searching for his missing mentor, Thomas Hengwr, while simultaneously eluding the newly formed Project Mindreach from the Royal Canadian Mounted Police. When Sara and Kieran run into each other and end up in "the other world", they find that there is much more to Sara and to Tamson House (Sara and Jamie's house the size of a city block) than previously known. But when an ancient evil resurfaces and threatens to destroy both worlds (and all the people within), the officers, wizards, and Tamson House residents have to learn to work together to destroy the monster.

Characters
Sara Kendell – A young woman who, along with her uncle Jamie, runs a store that sells all manner of old and curious items.
Jamie Tamson (Jamie Tams, for short) – Sara's eccentric uncle, who maintains a keen interest in mythology and the occult.
Taliesin – A Welsh bard, whom Sara meets and makes an immediate connection with.
Thomas Hengwr – Kieran's missing mentor.
Blue – A biker.
Tucker – A member of a secret Royal Canadian Mounted Police unit that is investigating paranormal phenomena.
Kieran Foy – A folk singer who happens to be Thomas Hengwr's apprentice.
Pukwudji – A trickster imp who befriends Sara.
Tamson House – While it's a house, it has an essence about it and its own spirit, and therefore merits being called a character.

Awards and nominations
 1985, IAFA William L. Crawford Fantasy Award winner.
 1985, Mythopoeic Awards, shortlist.
 1985, Locus Award, Fantasy Novel category, 21st place.

References

External links
 Moonheart at Charles de Lint's official website
 
 

1984 Canadian novels
1984 fantasy novels
Ace Books books
Fiction set in the 1980s
Novels by Charles de Lint
Novels set in Ottawa